Shabla may refer to:
 Shabla, a seaside town in Dobrich Province, Bulgaria
 Lake Shabla, a lagoon near the town
 Shabla Municipality
 Shabla Knoll, a hill on the South Shetland Islands, Antarctica

See also

Sharla